Ray June, A.S.C. (March 27, 1895 – May 26, 1958) was an American cinematographer during the early and classical Hollywood cinema. His best-known films are Babes in Arms and Funny Face. June attended Columbia University but did not graduate. His experience as a cameraman in the U.S. Army Signal Corps during World War I was instrumental to his success in Hollywood.

Partial filmography

The New Adventures of J. Rufus Wallingford (1915) (short)
Patria (1917)
The Great White Trail (1917)
The Eagle's Eye (1918) 
Bits of Life (1921)
 If Women Only Knew (1921)
 Racing Luck (1924)
 By Divine Right (1924)
 Missing Daughters (1924)
 The Shadow on the Wall (1925)
 One of the Bravest (1925)
The Golden Web (1926)
 The Phantom of the Forest (1926)
 The Silent Power (1926)
 Racing Blood (1926)
 King of the Pack (1926)
 The Sign of the Claw (1926)
Heroes of the Night (1927)
 Through Thick and Thin (1927)
 The Girl from Rio (1927)
 The Silent Avenger (1927)
 Quarantined Rivals (1927)
 The Woman Who Did Not Care (1927)
 The Opening Night (1927)
 The Final Extra (1927)
 Mountains of Manhattan (1927)
 Sinews of Steel (1927)
So This Is Love? (1928) 
United States Smith (1928)
 A Woman's Way (1928)
Alibi (1929)
 Times Square (1929)
The Locked Door (1929)
Puttin' On the Ritz (1930)
The Eyes of the World (1930)
The Lottery Bride (1930)
The Bat Whispers (1930)
Reaching for the Moon (1930)
Arrowsmith (1931)
Corsair (1931)
Bought! (1931)
Indiscreet (1931)
Horse Feathers (1932)
Disorderly Conduct (1932)
Roman Scandals (1933)
I Cover the Waterfront (1933)
Secrets (1933)
Treasure Island (1934)
Barbary Coast (1935)
China Seas (1935)
Born to Dance (1936)
The Great Ziegfeld (1936) (sequence)
Riffraff (1936)
Broadway Melody of 1938 (1937) (uncredited)
Saratoga (1937)
Night Must Fall (1937)
Test Pilot (1938)
Rich Man, Poor Girl (1938)
Babes in Arms (1939)
Joy Scouts (1939) (short)
Lucky Night (1939)
Fast and Furious (1939)
Strike Up the Band (1940)
H.M. Pulham, Esq. (1941)
Ziegfeld Girl (1941)
I Married an Angel (1942)
Ziegfeld Follies (1945) (uncredited)
The Hoodlum Saint (1946)
The Beginning or the End (1947)
A Southern Yankee (1948)
The Bride Goes Wild (1948)
The Sun Comes Up (1949)
Mrs. O'Malley and Mr. Malone (1950)
Crisis (1950)
Shadow on the Wall (1950)
It's a Big Country (1951)
Callaway Went Thataway (1951)
 Day of Triumph (1954)
The Court Jester (1956)
The Seventh Sin (1957)
Funny Face (1957)
Gigi (1958) (uncredited)
Houseboat (1958)

Awards
June was nominated for three Academy Award for Best Cinematography:
1931 for Arrowsmith
1935 for Barbary Coast
1957 for Funny Face

References

External links 

1895 births
1958 deaths
Artists from Ithaca, New York
American cinematographers
Burials at Forest Lawn Memorial Park (Glendale)